People's Freedom Party may mean one of the following:

 People's Freedom Party (Russia)
 People's Freedom Party "For Russia without Lawlessness and Corruption"
 Constitutional Democratic Party, also called the People's Freedom Party
 Constitutional Democratic Party – Party of Popular Freedom, a 1990s Russian political party named after the original Constitutional Democratic Party
 People's Freedom Party (Nepal)